Phiaris stibiana is a species of moth in the family Tortricidae first described by Achille Guenée in 1845. It occurs across most of Europe. It was first formally described in 1845 as Sericoris stibiana.

Distribution
This species is present in most of Europe (Albania, Austria, Bosnia and Herzegovina, Bulgaria, Czech Republic, east European Russia, France, Germany, Greece, Hungary, Italy, North Macedonia, northwest European Russia, Poland, Romania, Slovakia, Slovenia, south European Russia, and former Yugoslavia), in the eastern Palearctic realm, and in the Near East.

Description
These medium-sized moths show pale brown forewings with dark brown markings and usually some silvery transversal thin stripes. The hindwings are uniformly brown.

Biology
Adults can be found from June to July, while larvae are present in August. They have been observed feeding on Alnus, Prunus, Vaccinium, Teucrium, Viburnum, and Rubus fruticosus.

References

External links
 "04752 Phiaris stibiana (Guenée, 1845)". Lepiforum e.V. 
 Mazzei, Paolo; Morel, Daniel & Panfili, Raniero "Phiaris stibiana (Guenée, [1845)"]. Moths and Butterflies of Europe and North Africa.
 "Phiaris stibiana (Guénée, 1855)". Lépidoptères de France.

Olethreutini
Moths of Europe
Moths described in 1845